Falih Faisal Fahad Al-Fayyadh  is an Iraqi politician, former head and advisor of the National Security Council, and currently the chairman of the Popular Mobilization Forces He is also the founder of the "Ataa Movement".

Biography
Al-Fayyadh was born on 27 March 1956 in Baghdad. He received his bachelor's degree in Electrical Engineering from the University of Mosul in 1977. He is the Chairman of the Popular Mobilization Forces and the Chairman and Founder of the Ataa Movement. He also served as advisor of National Security Council in the Iraqi government. 

On 8 January 2021, the U.S. Treasury Department sanctioned Al-Fayyadh for “his connection to serious human rights abuse,” and addressed his role in the violent repression of Iraqi protests beginning in October 2019. During the protests, Iranian-backed militias, headed by Al-Fayyadh used marksmen to fire live bullets, hot water and tear gas against anti-government protesters, leading to many deaths and injuries.

Positions
 Chairman of the Popular Mobilization Forces.
 Head & Advisor of National Security Council (Iraq).
 Founder and leader of Ataa movement.

References

External links

 Official site (Falih Alfayyadh)
 Speech of Falih Alfayyadh during the establishment of a Ataa movement - YouTube

1956 births
Living people
Politicians from Baghdad
Iraqi politicians
Iraqi Shia Muslims
Members of the Popular Mobilization Forces
University of Mosul alumni